The education system in Qatar is jointly directed and controlled by the Supreme Education Council (SEC) and the Ministry of Education and Higher Education (MOEHE) at all levels. The SEC is responsible for overseeing independent schools, whereas the MOE is responsible for providing support to private schools. Formal schooling officially began in 1956. Primary schooling is obligatory for every child and is free in public schools.

Education in Qatar is very diverse, with several schools representing a variety of international curriculum systems. There are approximately 338 international schools in the country. Several prestigious universities from around the world have satellite campuses in the country in Education City and within suburbs of the capital Doha.

Education system
In 2001, Qatar hired the RAND Corporation to analyse and reform its K-12 education system due to uncertainties over the quality of the pre-existent system. At the time RAND's study was conducted, over 100,000 students were served by the Qatari education system; two-thirds of whom attended government-operated schools. RAND also proposed numerous reforms to the system to the Qatari government, with an emphasis on improving the curricula.

As a response to the RAND study, the Supreme Education Council launched the Education for a New Era (EFNE) initiative in 2001 and introduced nationwide policy reforms. One of the cardinal objectives of the EFNE was to adopt a Western education system for its preschool system. The SEC also aimed to increase overall enrollment in preschools with this initiative. In 2005, the SEC raised curriculum standards in Arabic, mathematics and sciences for all grades. A large number of independent schools were also opened shortly after. Twelve independent schools opened in 2004, twenty-one in 2005 and thirteen in 2006.

An assessment test published in 2008 revealed that only a small portion of students were able to meet the new curriculum standards. Approximately 10% met the standards in English, 5% in Arabic and less than 1% met the standards in mathematics and sciences. A 2015 study conducted by the OECD ranked Qatar in the bottom 10 of its educational index.

Education was an integral part of the Qatar National Development Strategy 2011–2016. Furthermore, the Qatar National Vision 2030 sets a number of objectives for the country's education system. Qatar's government is promoting education so that it can solidify its national identity, promote morals and social value within its population, and diversify its economy away from hydrocarbons.

In 2021 Qatar was one of the first in groups of IT Technology sharetesting to emphasize and use debate methods with Textbook Style performances over its media platform directly into homes. It was hoped using the new technology leadership for putting it out there would inspire newer forms of radical training and help pressure improvements. Qatar in 2021 signaled it would stop the practice immediately after its first debate ended with a complete withdraw after it was entered into records.

History

Islamic education
Prior to the 20th century, Qatari society did not place any specific emphasis on formal education. This was common in traditional Bedouin culture. Rather, Quranic education was highly valued in urban society, and to a lesser extent, rural society. Most children living in urban settlements were taught how to memorize, understand and read the Quran. This type of education was typically completed by the age of 10, whereupon the child's family would celebrate al khatma, or the end of memorizing the Quran. By the 18th century, Zubarah, the most important town in the peninsula, had developed into a center of Islamic education.

Islamic schools were divided into three categories known as mosques, kuttabs and madrasas. Mahmud Shukri Al-Alusi, an Islamic scholar, stated that between 1878 and 1913, there were around 20 kuttabs, 30 madrasahs and 400 mosques in the al-Hasa region, which included Qatar.

Mosques, in addition to serving as places of prayer, were also regarded as educational facilities as they provided Muslims with religious instruction and advice.

Kuttabs, which were also known as mutta or muttawa, were split into two sub-sections. The first type of kuttab taught only the Quran and basic religious principles and were very wide spread in both rural and urban areas. Children of both sexes could attend them, although they were gender segregated. Male children were taught in public areas or mosques, whereas females were taught privately in houses. The other variation of kuttab taught reading, writing and arithmetic in addition to the Quran. They were found only in large urban settlements, such as Doha, and were attended by children of wealthy families. There were several limitations on kuttabs, many of stemmed from the lack of qualifications of the instructors who staffed them.

Madrasas were advanced educational institutes which taught Islamic sciences and Arabic literature. They were located primarily in urban settlements. The country's most reputable madrasa in the early 20th century, Al-Madrasa al-Sheikh Muhammad Abdulaziz Al-Ma'na, was established in 1918 by a Bahraini sheikh. Its staff was composed of many highly educated instructors. The syllabus had an emphasis on Arabic literature and the Arabic language. There was no fixed number of years for a student to graduate. The madrasa produced some of the country's most highly skilled individuals, including a number of poets and government officials. It was closed in 1938.

Pre-modern and modern education

In 1949, the country's first formal school was established in Doha by the emir of Qatar under the name Islah al-Mohammadiyeh. It was staffed by one teacher and had 50 students. It experienced rapid development in its initial years, and by 1950–51, it was estimated to have accommodated 240 students and 6 teachers. The syllabus encompassed a broad range of topics, including religious education, geography, English, arithmetic and grammar. It imported its textbooks from Egypt. The city's second school was established in 1954.

Soon after the establishment of the country's first school in Doha, schools began their expansion into other settlements. A semi-primary school was established in Al Khor in 1952, and the first school in Ar Ru'ays was founded in 1954, raising the number of schools to four. Overall, there were 560 students and 26 teachers in 1954. The first formal girls' school opened its doors in 1955 in Doha.

In 1956, the Ministry of Education was founded, marking the beginning of several educational initiatives on a national scale. Seventeen primary schools were established that year, and accommodated 1,333 students and 80 teachers. In 1957, girls' schools were integrated into the national educational programme. That year, two girls' schools accommodating 451 students and 14 female teachers were formed. Girls' education grew at a rapid rate over the following years, until 1975–76 when the number of girls' schools equaled the number of boys' schools at 65 each.

A policy instated by the Ministry of Education during the 1950s limited the number of schools in order to balance the student-to-teacher ratio. Additionally, they provided teachers with numerous incentives, such as furnished accommodation and annual round-trip tickets.

The development of the school system witnessed the establishment of nine schools in rural villages in 1957. The villages included Umm Salal, Simaisma, Abu Dhalouf, Al Ghariyah, and Al Khuwayr. There were approximately 369 students and 14 teachers in village schools that year. The government invested heavily in rural schools into the 1960s. By 1965, there was a total of 54 schools in villages, with 37 being exclusive to boys and 17 being exclusive to girls. This was partly a result of Qatari tribes exerting pressure on the government to establish schools in their villages in order to avoid the need for their children to attend schools in neighboring villages. However, this initiative was halted as a result of large-scale domestic emigration to Doha in the following years. There were 70 schools in 1969. In the 1970s, the government initiated a policy of re-locating village inhabitants to larger nearby settlements where they then established co-educational primary and secondary schools.

There were four major school administrative zones by the early 1990s: Al Shamal (north Qatar), Doha, Al Khor (north-east Qatar), and Dukhan (west Qatar). The number of students in Qatar in 1996 was approximately 51,000, with 35,000 being primary students and 16,000 being secondary students. There were 8,000 university students.

Education Authorities
Control of education is currently shared between the Ministry of Education and the Supreme Education council. Funding to the Ministry of Education has been reduced and many schools have been transferred to the Supreme Education Council.

Supreme Education Council

Supreme Education Council (SEC) was created by decree number 37 in the year 2002. From 2006 onward, the council directs and controls the education system at all levels from pre-school through university. The SEC directs three educational institutes:
The Education Institute, which directly oversees and semi-independent schools and develops curriculum standards.
The Evaluation Institute, which conducts national assessments of student learning of independent K-12 schools and is responsible for licensing teachers.
The Higher Education Institute, which assists students in applying for colleges.

Ministry of Education (Supreme Education Council)
Formed in 1956, the Ministry of Education currently supports private schools with educational facility inspections, health services, and electricity and water. Its personnel were consolidated into Supreme Education Council in 2009.

The Qatar Foundation for Education, Science and Community Development
Qatar Foundation for Education, Science and Community Development is a private, chartered, non-profit organization in the state of Qatar, founded in 1995. Under Qatar Foundation's umbrella are Education City, which began construction in 2000 and which comprises several foreign universities, academic and training programs, and the Qatar Science & Technology Park.

Qatar Foundation launched the World Innovation Summit for Education – WISE – an annual global forum that brings together education stakeholders, opinion leaders and decision makers from all over the world to discuss educational issues.

International education institutions

Schools

There are a large number of private and international schools. Most expatriates and some Qataris choose to send their children to these schools. These schools (and curricula) include Qatar Academy (IB World School), Doha College (UK curriculum), American School of Doha, The Gulf English School (UK / IB curriculum), Doha Academy, Doha English Speaking School (UK primary curriculum), The International School of Choueifat, The Cambridge School, Dukhan English School, Park House English School, Compass International School, Qatar International School (UK Curriculum for England), MES Indian School and Ideal Indian School (CBSE), English Modern School, Philippine School Doha, Pearling Season International School, Stafford Sri Lankan School Doha, Middle East International School, Sherborne Qatar (UK curriculum) and Mesaieed International School.

The Vision International School in Al Wakrah will offer an American curriculum in grades PreK-12. It opened in September 2014.

As of January 2015, the International Schools Consultancy (ISC) listed Qatar as having 147 international schools. ISC defines an 'international school' in the following terms "ISC includes an international school if the school delivers a curriculum to any combination of pre-school, primary or secondary students, wholly or partly in English outside an English-speaking country, or if a school in a country where English is one of the official languages, offers an English-medium curriculum other than the country's national curriculum and is international in its orientation." This definition is used by publications including The Economist.

Educational Needs of Large Expatriate Work Force in Qatar

Expatriate workers have been playing their significant role in Qatar since the 1940s. First ever expatriate workers include from Egypt, Palestine, Iran & Pakistan later joined by Indians and Bangladeshis in the 1960s and 1970s. Onward 1990s, workers from Philippines, Nepal and Sri Lanka added in significant numbers in Qatar society. To meet the needs of Non-Arabic speaking expatriate children, Pak Shama School, a Pakistani community school was the first ever expatriate school opened in 1964 in Old Doha City, off AlAsmakh Street, opened by Edward Sardar and his wife (a Christian family from Sialkot district, Pakistan). Pak Shama School was affiliated with Lahore Educational Board. 2nd expatriate school Pakistani School was opened in 1967 later renamed in 1985 as Pakistan Educational Center (PEC). PEC is the first expatriate school, got school land in Abu Hamour District of Doha as gift from then ruler of State of Qatar Sheikh Khalifa bin Hamad AlThani. Now, a number of expatriate communities have their own schools and having their own educational syllabus, however, these schools are operated under the guidelines of Ministry of Education of Qatar.

Universities

The first university established in the country was Qatar University, founded as a teachers' college in 1973. It currently has eight colleges, including Education, Business and Economics, Arts and Sciences, Engineering, Sharia, Pharmacy, Law, and Medicine. Several universities from other countries have opened satellite campuses in the country. For example, some American universities have campuses at Education City. These include Cornell University, Weill Medical College, Carnegie Mellon University, Georgetown University, Virginia Commonwealth University, Northwestern University in Qatar and Texas A&M University. Universities from Canada include College of the North Atlantic-Qatar and the University of Calgary-Qatar. There is a branch of Dutch Stenden University in Qatar. HEC Paris was the first European partner to join Education City. University College London is the first British university to have opened a campus in Qatar. On top of that, Qatar Faculty of Islamic Studies is the graduate school and international center of excellence in Islamic Studies that is under the umbrella of Hamad Bin Khalifa University and attached to Qatar Foundation.

Educational initiatives

The Qatari government has taken a unique approach to education through AL-Bairaq, an outreach program targeting high school students which focuses on a curriculum that is based on STEM fields. The idea behind AL-Bairaq is to offer high school students the opportunity to connect with the research environment in the Center for Advanced Materials (CAM) at Qatar University.

In 2009, the government launched the World Innovation Summit for Education (WISE), a global forum that brings together education stakeholders, opinion leaders and decision makers from all over the world to discuss educational issues. The first edition was held in Doha in November 2009. WISE has been involved in fundraising efforts for Haiti in an attempt to help rebuild the country's education system which suffered as a result of the 2010 Haiti earthquake. Additionally, WISE has created a Nobel-equivalent prize for education, with a $500,000 award for its recipient.

See also
Education in the Arab World

References

Bibliography

External links 

 Short courses for professionals in Qatar | Laimoon.com
 Supreme Education Council – "Education for a New Era"  Arabic
 Qatar Visitor – List of private schools in Qatar
 Education in Qatar
 Homeschooling in Qatar

Links to some school and university websites
 Qatar Faculty of Islamic Studies
 Qatar University
 Qatar Finance and Business Academy
 Qatar Academy
 Compass International School
 Doha College
 Doha English Speaking School
 Stenden University
 The Cambridge School Doha
 Cambridge International School for Girls
 University College London Qatar
 HEC Paris